Petrich may refer to

 Petrich, a city in south-western Bulgaria, Blagoevgrad province
 Petrich (village), a village in western Bulgaria, Sofia province
 Petrich (surname)
 Petrich Peak, an ice-covered peak in the Antarctica
 The name of Petarch until 1934
 A medieval name of the Asenova krepost

See also 
 Petric (disambiguation)